A maloca is an ancestral long house used by indigenous people of the Amazon, notably in Colombia and Brazil. Each community has a single maloca with its own unique characteristics. Several families with patrilineal relations live together in a maloca, distributed around the long house in different compartments. In general, the chief of the local descent group lives in the compartment nearest to the back wall of the long house. As well, each family has its own furnace.

During festivals and in formal ceremonies, which involve dances for males, the long house space is rearranged; the centre of the long house is the most important area where the dance takes place. Each maloca has two entrances, for men and for women. Married men and women sleep together, and unmarried men sleep separately, as do unmarried women. A maloca is traditionally surrounded with two gardens: the inner called the kitchen gardens (growing plants such as bananas, papaya, mango and pineapple) and the manioc gardens growing manioc (yuca).

See also 
 Maloca is also a synonym for malón, a Mapuche raid.
 Jesuit Missions of Chiquitos, partly inspired by indigenous architecture

References

External links 
 La Maloca de los Sabedores de Oscar Freire

Huts
Indigenous culture of the Amazon
Indigenous culture in Brazil
Indigenous architecture of the Americas